ReserveAmerica, owned by Aspira, is a product that provides online campsite reservations and license processing for state, provincial, private, and local government parks, campgrounds, and conservation agencies in North America.  It claims to be the "#1 Access Point for Outdoor Recreation,"  processing more than 3.5 million camping reservations per year, with more than 150,000 campsites available.

History
ReserveAmerica was founded in 1984 as a software development company specializing in reservations for the local recreation industry. In 1992, the company developed a reservation system for state and federal park systems, which they claim processed the industry's first online reservation in September, 1997. ReserveAmerica has provided reservations services for the National Park Service since 1997. In 2001, they were acquired by InterActiveCorp (IAC), which owns Ask.com, Citysearch, and Match.com.

In June, 2005, the United States Forest Service awarded the company a $97 million contract to provide a single source federal recreation information and reservation service. As of September 2014, the reservation service offers centralized information for more than 100,000 campgrounds, cabins, parks and tours of national sites, historic homes, and caves through a single Web-based portal.  Besides the Forest Service, participating agencies include the National Park Service, the Bureau of Land Management, the Bureau of Reclamation, and the U.S. Army Corps of Engineers. ReserveAmerica also has some state parks contracts.

In 2009, IAC sold ReserveAmerica to ACTIVE Network. In 2017, the Communities and Sports divisions of ACTIVE Network were acquired by Global Payments and ACTIVE Network's Outdoors division, including ReserveAmerica, became the independent company, Aspira. Headquartered in Dallas, Texas, with nine offices spanning the United States, Canada and Asia.

References

Online retailers of Canada
Travel technology